Religion in Niger State is mainly Islam and Christianity. The Sharia is valid for areas with a mainly Muslim population. The Roman Catholic Diocese of Minna and the Roman Catholic Diocese of Kontagora have their seat in the state. Darul Islam (Nigeria) is present in the state.

See also
Nigerian sectarian violence

Niger State
Religion in Nigeria